Pond Inlet Airport  is located at Pond Inlet, Nunavut, Canada, and is operated by the government of Nunavut.

Airlines and destinations

References

External links

Airports in the Arctic
Baffin Island
Certified airports in the Qikiqtaaluk Region